Hans-Georg Leyser (16 June 1896 – 18 April 1980) was a general in the Wehrmacht during World War II who commanded the 29. Infanterie-Division. He was a recipient of the Knight's Cross of the Iron Cross. Leyser surrendered on 31 January 1943 during the Battle of Stalingrad.

Awards and decorations

 Knight's Cross of the Iron Cross on 3 May 1942 as Oberst and commander of Infanterie-Regiment 51 (mot.)

References

Citations

Bibliography

1896 births
1980 deaths
German commanders at the Battle of Stalingrad
German Army personnel of World War I
German prisoners of war in World War II held by the Soviet Union
Major generals of the German Army (Wehrmacht)
Military personnel from Brandenburg
People from the Province of Brandenburg
Recipients of the clasp to the Iron Cross, 1st class
Recipients of the Gold German Cross
Recipients of the Knight's Cross of the Iron Cross
People from Märkisch-Oderland
German Army generals of World War II